Otwell may refer to:

Otwell, Indiana
Otwell (Oxford, Maryland)
The Otwell Twins

See also
 Ottewell (disambiguation)